Aliabad is a village and the most populous municipality, except for the capital Zaqatala, in the Zaqatala District of Azerbaijan. It has a population of 10,700. The majority of population are ethnic Georgians

References 

Populated places in Zaqatala District